Prosje is a village in the municipality of Busovača, Bosnia and Herzegovina. The population of Prosje is 42 according to a 2013 census.

Demographics 
According to the 2013 census, its population was 41, all Croats.

References

Populated places in Busovača